The George J. Gould House was a mansion at 857 Fifth Avenue on the northeast corner of 67th Street in the Upper East Side neighborhood of Manhattan, New York City.

History 
The home was designed in the French Beaux-Arts style by architect Horace Trumbauer of Philadelphia and constructed in 1906 for financier George Jay Gould, the eldest son of railroad magnate Jay Gould. It replaced the Neo-Gothic style Jay Gould House, which was demolished. The new house was designed both to complement and outshine the Isaac Stern House next door, at 858 Fifth Avenue.

In 1923, the house was bought by Harry Payne Whitney, and in late 1925, it became the residence of his mother-in-law, Alice Claypoole Vanderbilt. After her death in 1934, it was inherited by her youngest child Gladys, Countess Széchenyi.

The site is now occupied by a white brick building completed in 1963, which contains 17 apartments.

References 
Notes

Bibliography
 
 Greg King. The Court of Mrs. Astor In Gilded Age New York. Wiley, 2008.

External links 

Fifth Avenue
Gould family residences
Vanderbilt family residences
Upper East Side
1906 establishments in New York City
Houses completed in 1906
Demolished buildings and structures in Manhattan
Gilded Age mansions